Hosea Washington Parker (May 30, 1833 – August 21, 1922) was a U.S. Representative from New Hampshire.

Biography
Born in Lempster, New Hampshire, Parker pursued classical studies. He attended Tufts College, Medford, Massachusetts, and was graduated from the Green Mountain Liberal Institute, South Woodstock, Vermont. He studied law and was admitted to the bar in 1859, commencing practice in Lempster.

He served as member of the New Hampshire House of Representatives in 1859 and 1860. He moved to Claremont, New Hampshire, in 1860, and served as delegate to the Democratic National Convention in 1868, 1880, 1884, and 1888.

Parker was elected as a Democrat to the Forty-second and Forty-third Congresses (March 4, 1871 – March 3, 1875). While in Washington, he was largely responsible for the refusal of patent extension resulting in the overthrow of the Sewing Machine monopoly. He was an unsuccessful candidate for reelection in 1874 to the Forty-fourth Congress. He resumed the practice of law and served as member of the State constitutional convention in 1918.  He died in Claremont, New Hampshire, August 21, 1922, and was interred in Mountain View Cemetery.

References

1833 births
1922 deaths
New Hampshire lawyers
Democratic Party members of the New Hampshire House of Representatives
Democratic Party members of the United States House of Representatives from New Hampshire
People from Lempster, New Hampshire
19th-century American lawyers